Túlio Gustavo Cunha Souza or simply Túlio Souza  (born March 25, 1983, in Campina Grande), is a Brazilian soccer player. A defensive midfielder, he currently plays for Brasil de Pelotas.

Honours
Pernambuco State League: 2001
Paraíba State League: 2005
Taça Rio: 2008

References

External links
 sambafoot 

1983 births
Living people
Brazilian footballers
Sport Club do Recife players
Esporte Clube Bahia players
Clube de Regatas Brasil players
Ceará Sporting Club players
Treze Futebol Clube players
Esporte Clube Juventude players
Canoas Sport Club players
Esporte Clube Santo André players
Guarani FC players
Coritiba Foot Ball Club players
Botafogo de Futebol e Regatas players
Botafogo Futebol Clube (SP) players
Duque de Caxias Futebol Clube players
Vila Nova Futebol Clube players
Itumbiara Esporte Clube players
Al-Faisaly SC players
Expatriate footballers in Jordan
People from Campina Grande
Association football midfielders
Sportspeople from Paraíba